Ramsés Maximiliano Bustos Guerrero (born 13 October 1991) is a Chilean footballer who plays as a striker.

Career
A product of Unión Española youth system, Bustos played for many clubs in Chile and outside of his country of birth, he played for clubs in Thailand. In 2013 he joined Buriram United, winning the 2013 Thai Premier League and the 2013 Kor Royal Cup. In 2017 he returned to the country after having played in Chile, to join Nongbua Pitchaya and next Super Power Samut Prakan. After legal issues of Super Power, renamed Jumpasri United in 2018, he returned to Chile in 2019.

Personal life
He is nicknamed El Faraón del Gol (The Pharaoh of the Goal) due to his first name Ramsés (Ramesses in English).

Honours
Buriram United
 Thai Premier League: 2013
 Kor Royal Cup: 2013

References
.

External links

Ramsés at Football Lineups
Ramsés Bustos at PlaymakerStats

1991 births
Living people
Footballers from Santiago
Chilean footballers
Chilean expatriate footballers
Chile under-20 international footballers
Association football forwards
Unión Española footballers
A.C. Barnechea footballers
Ramses Bustos
Deportes La Serena footballers
Municipal La Pintana footballers
Deportes Copiapó footballers
Deportes Valdivia footballers
Ramses Bustos
Ramses Bustos
Chilean Primera División players
Segunda División Profesional de Chile players
Primera B de Chile players
Ramses Bustos
Ramses Bustos
Chilean expatriate sportspeople in Thailand
Expatriate footballers in Thailand